Arthur Davidson, QC (7 November 1928 – 16 January 2018) was a British Labour Party politician.

Early life
Davidson was educated at Liverpool College, King George V School, Southport, and Trinity College, Cambridge, where he was a member of the university athletics team and captained the college team. He served with the Merchant Navy and became a barrister, called to the bar by Middle Temple in 1953, and appointed a QC in 1978.

Political career
Davidson contested Blackpool South in 1955 and Preston North in 1959. He was Member of Parliament for Accrington from 1966 to 1983, when the seat was abolished by boundary changes. He stood in the new seat of Hyndburn, but lost by just 21 votes to the Conservative Ken Hargreaves.

He was a minister in the Attorney General's Department between 1974 and 1979, under Harold Wilson and James Callaghan. From November 1982 to June 1983, he was Shadow Attorney General.

Outside parliament
He was an expert in sports and media law, and acted for sportsmen including Robbie Fowler, Frank Bruno, Jimmy Hill and Kenny Dalglish. He was legal director of Associated Newspapers from 1985 to 1991 and Legal Director of Mirror Group Newspapers from 1991 to 1993, and worked at Express Newspapers. His final job was as the lawyer for the magazine Time Out in London.

He enjoyed jazz, and was a passionate supporter of Liverpool Football Club. Davidson died in January 2018, at the age of 89.

Notes

References
Times Guide to the House of Commons, 1955, 1966 & 1983

External links 
 

1928 births
2018 deaths
Alumni of Trinity College, Cambridge
British barristers
British Merchant Navy personnel
Deaths from falls
English King's Counsel
Labour Party (UK) MPs for English constituencies
Members of the Fabian Society
Members of the Middle Temple
People educated at King George V College
People educated at Liverpool College
Politics of Hyndburn
20th-century King's Counsel
Society of Lithographic Artists, Designers and Engravers-sponsored MPs
UK MPs 1966–1970
UK MPs 1970–1974
UK MPs 1974
UK MPs 1974–1979
UK MPs 1979–1983
20th-century English lawyers